The 2010 GP Ouest-France was a one-day road race which took place on 22 August 2010 in Plouay, France.

Results

Teams
Twenty five teams were invited to the 2010 GP Ouest-France. 

Teams from the UCI Pro Tour

Teams awarded a wildcard invitation

External links 
 2010 GP Ouest-France

2010
2010 UCI World Ranking
2010 in French sport
GP Ouest-France